In mathematics, the absolute value or modulus of a real number ,  is the non-negative value  without regard to its sign. Namely,  if  is a positive number, and  if  is negative (in which case negating  makes  positive), and  For example, the absolute value of 3  and the absolute value of −3 is  The absolute value of a number may be thought of as its distance from zero.

Generalisations of the absolute value for real numbers occur in a wide variety of mathematical settings. For example, an absolute value is also defined for the complex numbers, the quaternions, ordered rings, fields and vector spaces. The absolute value is closely related to the notions of magnitude, distance, and norm in various mathematical and physical contexts.

Terminology and notation
In 1806, Jean-Robert Argand introduced the term module, meaning unit of measure in French, specifically for the complex absolute value, and it was borrowed into English in 1866 as the Latin equivalent modulus. The term absolute value has been used in this sense from at least 1806 in French and 1857 in English. The notation , with a vertical bar on each side, was introduced by Karl Weierstrass in 1841. Other names for absolute value include numerical value and magnitude. In programming languages and computational software packages, the absolute value of x is generally represented by abs(x), or a similar expression.

The vertical bar notation also appears in a number of other mathematical contexts: for example, when applied to a set, it denotes its cardinality; when applied to a matrix, it denotes its determinant.  Vertical bars denote the absolute value only for algebraic objects for which the notion of an absolute value is defined, notably an element of a normed division algebra, for example a real number, a complex number, or a quaternion.  A closely related but distinct notation is the use of vertical bars for either the Euclidean norm or sup norm of a vector  although double vertical bars with subscripts   respectively) are a more common and less ambiguous notation.

Definition and properties

Real numbers
For any  the absolute value or modulus  is denoted , with a vertical bar on each side of the quantity, and is defined as

The absolute value  is thus always either a positive number or zero, but never negative. When  itself is negative  then its absolute value is necessarily positive 

From an analytic geometry point of view, the absolute value of a real number is that number's distance from zero along the real number line, and more generally the absolute value of the difference of two real numbers (their absolute difference) is the distance between them. The notion of an abstract distance function in mathematics can be seen to be a generalisation of the absolute value of the difference (see "Distance" below).

Since the square root symbol represents the unique positive square root, when applied to a positive number, it follows that

This is equivalent to the definition above, and may be used as an alternative definition of the absolute value of real numbers.

The absolute value has the following four fundamental properties (a, b are real numbers), that are used for generalization of this notion to other domains:

Non-negativity, positive definiteness, and multiplicativity are readily apparent from the definition. To see that subadditivity holds, first note that   with its sign chosen to make the result positive.

Some additional useful properties are given below.  These are either immediate consequences of the definition or implied by the four fundamental properties above.

Two other useful properties concerning inequalities are:

These relations may be used to solve inequalities involving absolute values. For example:

The absolute value, as "distance from zero", is used to define the absolute difference between arbitrary real numbers, the standard metric on the real numbers.

Complex numbers

Since the complex numbers are not ordered, the definition given at the top for the real absolute value cannot be directly applied to complex numbers. However, the geometric interpretation of the absolute value of a real number as its distance from 0 can be generalised. The absolute value of a complex number is defined by the Euclidean distance of its corresponding point in the complex plane from the origin.  This can be computed using the Pythagorean theorem: for any complex number

When a complex number  is expressed in its polar form  its absolute value 

Since the product of any complex number  and its  with the same absolute value, is always the non-negative real number  the absolute value of a complex number  is the square root  which is therefore called the absolute square or squared modulus 

This generalizes the alternative definition for reals: 

The complex absolute value shares the four fundamental properties given above for the real absolute value. The identity  is a special case of multiplicativity that is often useful by itself.

Absolute value function

The real absolute value function is continuous everywhere. It is monotonically decreasing on the interval  and monotonically increasing on the interval . Since a real number and its opposite have the same absolute value, it is an even function, and is hence not invertible. The real absolute value function is a piecewise linear, convex function.

For both real and complex numbers the absolute value function is idempotent (meaning that the absolute value of any absolute value is itself).

Relationship to the sign function
The absolute value function of a real number returns its value irrespective of its sign, whereas the sign (or signum) function returns a number's sign irrespective of its value. The following equations show the relationship between these two functions:

or

Derivative

The real absolute value function is an example of a continuous function that achieves a global minimum where the derivative does not exist.

The subdifferential of  at  is the interval .

The complex absolute value function is continuous everywhere but complex differentiable nowhere because it violates the Cauchy–Riemann equations.

The second derivative of  with respect to  is zero everywhere except zero, where it does not exist. As a generalised function, the second derivative may be taken as two times the Dirac delta function.

Antiderivative
The antiderivative (indefinite integral) of the real absolute value function is

where  is an arbitrary constant of integration. This is not a complex antiderivative because complex antiderivatives can only exist for complex-differentiable (holomorphic) functions, which the complex absolute value function is not.

Distance

The absolute value is closely related to the idea of distance. As noted above, the absolute value of a real or complex number is the distance from that number to the origin, along the real number line, for real numbers, or in the complex plane, for complex numbers, and more generally, the absolute value of the difference of two real or complex numbers is the distance between them.

The standard Euclidean distance between two points

and

in Euclidean -space is defined as:

 
{|
|-
|
|
|-
|
|
|-
|
|
|}

The above shows that the "absolute value"-distance, for real and complex numbers, agrees with the standard Euclidean distance, which they inherit as a result of considering them as one and two-dimensional Euclidean spaces, respectively.

The properties of the absolute value of the difference of two real or complex numbers: non-negativity, identity of indiscernibles, symmetry and the triangle inequality given above, can be seen to motivate the more general notion of a distance function as follows:

A real valued function  on a set  is called a metric (or a distance function) on , if it satisfies the following four axioms:
{|
|-
|style="width:250px" | 
|Non-negativity
|-
|
|Identity of indiscernibles
|-
|
|Symmetry
|-
|
|Triangle inequality
|}

Generalizations

Ordered rings
The definition of absolute value given for real numbers above can be extended to any ordered ring.

where  is the additive inverse of , 0 is the additive identity, and < and ≥ have the usual meaning with respect to the ordering in the ring.

Fields

The four fundamental properties of the absolute value for real numbers can be used to generalise the notion of absolute value to an arbitrary field, as follows.

A real-valued function  on a field  is called an absolute value (also a modulus, magnitude, value, or valuation) if it satisfies the following four axioms:

{| cellpadding=10
|-
|
|Non-negativity
|-
|
|Positive-definiteness
|-
|
|Multiplicativity
|-
|
|Subadditivity or the triangle inequality
|}

Where 0 denotes the additive identity of . It follows from positive-definiteness and multiplicativity that , where 1 denotes the multiplicative identity of . The real and complex absolute values defined above are examples of absolute values for an arbitrary field.

  is bounded in R.
  for every .
  for all .
  for all .

An absolute value which satisfies any (hence all) of the above conditions is said to be non-Archimedean, otherwise it is said to be Archimedean.

Vector spaces

Again the fundamental properties of the absolute value for real numbers can be used, with a slight modification, to generalise the notion to an arbitrary vector space.

{| cellpadding=10
|-
|
|Non-negativity
|-
|
|Positive-definiteness
|-
|
|Positive homogeneity or positive scalability
|-
|
|Subadditivity or the triangle inequality
|}

The norm of a vector is also called its length or magnitude.

In the case of Euclidean space , the function defined by

is a norm called the Euclidean norm. When the real numbers  are considered as the one-dimensional vector space , the absolute value is a norm, and is the -norm (see Lp space) for any .

The complex absolute value is a special case of the norm in an inner product space, which is identical to the Euclidean norm when the complex plane is identified as the Euclidean plane .

Composition algebras

Every composition algebra A has an involution x → x* called its conjugation. The product in A of an element x and its conjugate x* is written N(x) = x x* and called the norm of x.

The real numbers , complex numbers , and quaternions  are all composition algebras with norms given by definite quadratic forms. The absolute value in these division algebras is given by the square root of the composition algebra norm.

In general the norm of a composition algebra may be a quadratic form that is not definite and has null vectors. However, as in the case of division algebras, when an element x has a non-zero norm, then x has a multiplicative inverse given by x*/N(x).

See also
Least absolute values

Notes

References
 Bartle; Sherbert; Introduction to real analysis (4th ed.), John Wiley & Sons, 2011 .
 Nahin, Paul J.; An Imaginary Tale; Princeton University Press; (hardcover, 1998). .
 Mac Lane, Saunders, Garrett Birkhoff, Algebra, American Mathematical Soc., 1999. .
 Mendelson, Elliott, Schaum's Outline of Beginning Calculus, McGraw-Hill Professional, 2008. .
 O'Connor, J.J. and Robertson, E.F.; "Jean Robert Argand".
 Schechter, Eric; Handbook of Analysis and Its Foundations, pp. 259–263, "Absolute Values", Academic Press (1997) .

External links
 
 
 

Special functions
Real numbers
Norms (mathematics)